Actin-like 8 is a protein in humans that is encoded by the ACTL8 gene. It is a protein that is used in making the intracellular architecture of cells.

References

External links

Further reading